Eliot Robert Connors (born August 8, 1984) is an American sound designer.  He has worked on numerous game and film projects, his work being credited as Supervising Sound Editor and Sound Designer.

Career
He started his career on AAA games such as The Last of Us ,  Resident Evil 6, Gears of War: Judgment,  Alan Wake, Skylanders, Lost Planet 2 , and many more.  Game work lead to contributions in Film and TV such as Arcane (TV series), Frozen_2, Hobbs_%26_Shaw, Aquaman (film), Blade Runner 2049,  Justice League (film), Star Trek Beyond, The Conjuring 2, The Last Witch Hunter, and Paranormal Activity: The Ghost Dimension.

He has received 13 Golden Reel Award nominations. Winning 3 times. Outstanding Achievement in Sound Editing - Non-Theatrical Animation on Arcane_(TV_series), Outstanding Achievement in Sound Editing- Effect/Foley on Blade Runner 2049 and Best Sound Editing - Computer Interactive Entertainment on Resident Evil 6.

Film

Tv

Animation and video games

References

External links
https://www.youtube.com/watch?v=3XBii3kt3q0/ / The Sound & Music of Arcane: League of Legends
https://www.asoundeffect.com/arcane-sound/ / HOW ARCANE’S SONIC MAGIC IS MADE
https://www.asoundeffect.com/frozen-2-sound/ / BEHIND THE CRYSTALLINE SOUND OF FROZEN 2
https://www.asoundeffect.com/aquaman-sound/ / DESIGNING AQUAMAN’S DRAMATIC DEEP-SEA SOUND
http://www.asoundeffect.com/star-trek-beyond-sound-design// / A Sound Effect:THE INSIDE-STORY BEHIND THE SOUND FOR STAR TREK BEYOND
https://www.imdb.com/name/nm3192860/ / IMDB Page
http://www.audiorecordingschool.com/blog/audio-is-fun-games-for-cras-grad-eliot-connors/ / CRAS interview
http://www.mobygames.com/developer/sheet/view/developerId,349128/ MobyGames information page

1984 births
Living people
People from Richland County, Wisconsin